Pachyatheta is a genus of beetles belonging to the family Staphylinidae.

Species:
 Pachyatheta mortuorum (Thomson, 1867) 
 Pachyatheta cribrata (Kraatz, 1856)

References

Staphylinidae
Staphylinidae genera